The Bofors Hotel is a four-storey hotel located in Karlskoga, Karlskoga Municipality, Sweden.

History 
The current-standing hotel was initially intended to exclusively serve the guests of arms manufacturer Bofors. The hotel building is the arms manufacturer's third hotel.

Eick customized it for important meetings.

The Bofors Hotel, which remains a popular destination for businesspeople and dignitaries to this day, received its first royal visitor in September 1931 when King Gustav V stayed at the property. Swedish Prime Minister Per Albin Hansson also visited the hotel during the 1930s.

In the years that followed, the hotel continued to host royalty, including the current King, who visited in 1973, King Carl XVI Gustaf, who also came in 1983 accompanied by Queen Silvia of Sweden.

The hotel has played host to many other famous guests over the years. Some notable guests include Prince Bertil.

See also 

 Bofors
 Mässen

References

Citations

Sources

External links 

 

Hotel buildings completed in 1930
Hotels established in the 1930s
Buildings and structures in Karlskoga Municipality
Bofors
1930s establishments in Sweden
Wilhelm Eick buildings